The Italy women's national 3x3 team is a national basketball team of Italy, administered by the Federazione Italiana Pallacanestro.
It represents the country in international women's 3x3 (3 against 3) basketball competitions.

They won the 2018 FIBA 3x3 World Cup – Women's tournament, their first international title and first ever victory of an Italian team in a FIBA sanctioned tournament. The 159 cm Raelin D'Alie won the MVP award.

International events

Summer Olympics

World Cup

European Games

European Championships

World Urban Games

Mediterranean Games

Women's Series

Head to head
Updated at 10th August 2022

Official matches against not-FIBA teams
Updated at 29th July 2022

Records

Most capped players
As of 10th August 2022, the players with the most appearances for Italy are:

See also
Italy women's national basketball team
Italy men's national 3x3 team

References

Italy women's national basketball team
Women's national 3x3 basketball teams